Vuk Martinović (born 19 September 1989) is a Serb-Montenegrin football defender who currently plays for FK Mornar.

Club career
Born in Titograd, Martinović started his career with local club Mladost, but he fully affirmed himself as a captain of OFK Grbalj. Later, he was with Lovćen Cetinje, where he made more than 100 caps. After time he spent with Lovćen, he spent a sport period with Bosnian second tier Mladost Velika Obarska, before he joined OFK Beograd, beginning of 2016.

Honours
Lovćen
Montenegrin Cup: 2013–14
Montenegro Second League 2020-2021
Winner

Career statistics

References

External links
 
 Vuk Martinović stats at utakmica.rs
 Vuk Martinović stats at footballdatabase.eu
 

1989 births
Living people
Footballers from Podgorica
Association football fullbacks
Montenegrin footballers
Montenegro under-21 international footballers
OFK Titograd players
OFK Grbalj players
FK Lovćen players
Syrianska FC players
FK Mladost Velika Obarska players
OFK Beograd players
FK Mornar players
Montenegrin First League players
Serbian SuperLiga players
Montenegrin Second League players
Montenegrin expatriate footballers
Montenegrin expatriate sportspeople in Sweden
Expatriate footballers in Sweden
Montenegrin expatriate sportspeople in Bosnia and Herzegovina
Expatriate footballers in Bosnia and Herzegovina
Montenegrin expatriate sportspeople in Serbia
Expatriate footballers in Serbia